Jack Pring (born ) is a Welsh professional rugby league footballer. He played at representative level for Wales, and at club level for Leeds Rhinos and South Wales Scorpions.

Background
Jack Pring was born in Cardiff, Wales.

Club career
Pring began his rugby league career in the junior ranks at Crusaders. South Wales Scorpions signed Pring on dual registration in 2011 before he joined Leeds Rhinos in 2012, playing in their U20's side. He rejoined South Wales Scorpions for the 2013 and 2014 seasons.

International honours
Jack Pring made his début for Wales against Italy in 2010. He won his second cap against France in 2012.

References

External links
Search for "Jack Pring" at bbc.co.uk

1993 births
Crusaders Rugby League players
Leeds Rhinos players
Living people
Rugby league centres
Rugby league wingers
Rugby league players from Cardiff
Wales national rugby league team players